KHRV (90.1 FM) is a radio station licensed to Hood River, Oregon. The station is owned by Oregon Public Broadcasting, and airs OPBs news and talk programming, consisting of syndicated programming from NPR, APM and PRI, as well as locally produced offerings.

FM Translator
KHRV programming is also heard on an FM translator on 94.3 MHz.

External links
opb.org

HRV
HRV
Hood River, Oregon